is a JR West railway station in the city of Fukui, Fukui, Japan.

Lines

Station layout
The station consists of one ground-level side platform serving single bi-directional track. There is no station building, but only a shelter on the platform. The station is unattended.

Adjacent stations

History
Rokujō Station opened on December 15, 1960.  With the privatization of Japanese National Railways (JNR) on 1 April 1987, the station came under the control of JR West.

Surrounding area
Fukui Rokujo Elementary School

See also
 List of railway stations in Japan

External links

  

Railway stations in Fukui Prefecture
Stations of West Japan Railway Company
Railway stations in Japan opened in 1960
Etsumi-Hoku Line
Fukui (city)